Stuart Lake Marine Provincial Park is a provincial park in British Columbia, Canada.

External links

Provincial parks of British Columbia
Regional District of Bulkley-Nechako
Protected areas established in 2001
2001 establishments in British Columbia
Marine parks of Canada